Warne is a town in the local government area of the Shire of Buloke, Victoria, Australia. It has a grain station on the Kulwin railway line.

References